Alligator Lake

Alligator Lake (Desha County, Arkansas)
Alligator Lake (Miller County, Arkansas)
Alligator Lake (Prairie County, Arkansas)
Alligator Lake, Yukon, a lake in Yukon
Alligator Lake, Texas, a lake in Texas
Alligator Lake, Osceola County, Florida, a lake in Florida
Alligator Lake, Columbia County, Florida, a lake in Florida
Alligator Lake Volcanic Complex, a volcano in Yukon